Jacob Daniel DeShazer (15 November 1912 – 15 March 2008) participated in the Doolittle Raid as a staff sergeant and later became a Christian missionary in Japan.

Early years
DeShazer was born on 15 November 1912 in West Stayton, Oregon and graduated from Madras High School in Madras, Oregon in 1931. On Sunday 7 December 1941, while peeling potatoes, DeShazer heard news of the attack on Pearl Harbor over the radio. He became enraged, shouting: "Japan is going to have to pay for this!" He also was an atheist.

Doolittle Raid
Following the attack on Pearl Harbor, Corporal DeShazer, along with other members of the 17th Bomb Group, volunteered to join a special unit that was formed to attack Japan. The 24 crews selected from the 17th BG received intensive training at Eglin Field, Florida, for three weeks beginning on Sunday 1 March 1942.

The crews undertook practice carrier deck takeoffs along with extensive flying exercises involving low-level and night flying, low altitude bombing and over water navigation. Their mission would be to fly modified B-25 Mitchell bombers launched from an aircraft carrier to attack Japan.

The unit formed to carry out the raid on Japan soon acquired the name, "Doolittle's Raiders", after their famous commander, Lieutenant Colonel Jimmy Doolittle. Staff Sergeant DeShazer was the bombardier of B-25 #16, the "Bat (Out of Hell)", commanded by Lieutenant William G. Farrow, the last of the 16 B-25s to launch from the USS Hornet. The raid was a success despite the task force being sighted and forced to launch the bombers earlier than planned, but part of the plan included flying the airplanes to bases in China, where they were to be refueled and made part of the Tenth Air Force.

Japanese prisoner of war
After bombing Nagoya, Japan, the "Bat" attempted to reach safe haven in China. DeShazer and the rest of the B-25 crew were forced to parachute into enemy territory over Ningpo, China when their B-25 ran out of fuel because of the extra distance it was forced to fly by early launch of the raid. DeShazer was injured in his fall into a cemetery and along with the rest of his crew, he was captured the very next day by the Japanese. During his captivity, DeShazer was sent to Tokyo with the survivors of another Doolittle crew including Robert Hite, and was held in a series of P.O.W. (prisoner-of-war) camps both in Japan and China for 40 months – 34 of them in solitary confinement. He was severely beaten and malnourished while three of the crew were executed by a firing squad, and another died of slow starvation. DeShazer's sentence was commuted to life imprisonment by Emperor Hirohito. As the war came to an end, on 20 August 1945, DeShazer and the others in the camp at Beijing (Peiping), China were finally released when American soldiers parachuted into the camp.

On his return to the United States, Staff Sgt. DeShazer was awarded both the Distinguished Flying Cross and the Purple Heart for his part in the Doolittle Raid.

Missionary in Japan
During his captivity, DeShazer persuaded one of his guards to loan him a copy of the Bible. Although he only had possession of the Bible for three weeks, he saw its messages as the reason for his survival and resolved to become a devout Christian. His conversion included learning a few words of Japanese and treating his captors with respect, which resulted in the guards reacting in a similar fashion.  After his release, DeShazer entered Seattle Pacific College, a Christian college associated with the Free Methodist denomination, and then Asbury Theological Seminary in Kentucky, where he began studies to become a missionary, eventually to return to Japan with his wife, Florence, in 1948.

DeShazer, the Doolittle Raider who bombed Nagoya, met Captain Mitsuo Fuchida, who led the attack on Pearl Harbor, becoming close friends.  (For That One Day: The Memoirs of Mitsuo Fuchida, Commander of the Attack on Pearl Harbor, translated by Douglas T. Shinsato and Tadanori Urabe.)    Fuchida became a Christian in 1950 after reading a tract written about DeShazer titled, I Was a Prisoner of Japan, and spent the rest of his life as a missionary in Asia and the United States. On occasion, DeShazer and Fuchida preached together as Christian missionaries in Japan. In 1959, DeShazer moved to Nagoya to establish a Christian church in the city he had bombed.

Legacy
His decorations include:

  USAAF Bombardier Badge

DeShazer retired after 30 years of missionary service in Japan and went back to his home town in Salem, Oregon where he spent the last years of his life in an assisted living home with his wife, Florence. On 15 March 2008, DeShazer died in his sleep at the age of 95, leaving his wife and five children: Paul, John, Mark, Carol, and Ruth.

On 15 April 2008, the Oregon War Veterans Association (OWVA) nominated DeShazer for the Presidential Medal of Freedom and the Congressional Gold Medal noting his extraordinary impact on America as a war hero and for his heroic service to the people of Japan, where he is well known as a hero of peace and reconciliation. On 21 April 2008, the White House confirmed the nomination in a letter to OWVA's executive director, Greg Warnock. President George W. Bush's Deputy Director for Awards said that the DeShazer nomination for the Presidential Medal of Freedom, the nation's most prestigious civilian award, second only to the nation's highest military award, the Medal of Honor would be given "every consideration" by the advisory staff, who will provide the President with the recommendation. The medals are usually awarded on or near 4 July annually. About 400 Presidential Medals of Freedom have been awarded since its inception in 1945.

Warnock nominated Rev. DeShazer for the Congressional Gold Medal through Congresswoman Darlene Hooley's (D-Ore.) office in Salem, Oregon. In the official nomination letters Warnock wrote, "At this time in our history, we feel it is ideal to honor a man who was a genuine war hero, [but] who after his sacrificial service put on gloves of peace, and touched the entire world with grace and humility."

See also
Louis Zamperini

References
Notes

Bibliography

 DeShazer, Jacob as told to Don Falkenberg. I was a Prisoner of Japan (Tract). Columbus, Ohio: The Bible Meditation League, 1950. (Out of print.)
 DeShazer, Jacob. Love Your Enemies, From Bombs to Bible. Seattle: Home Coming Chapel, 1972–73: Seattle Pacific College (now University SPU) (From the SPU Chapel Archives on iTunes 1), 1978–79.
 From Vengeance to Forgiveness: Jake DeShazer's Extraordinary Journey (DVD). Grand Rapids MI: Discovery House Publishers, 2007.
 "Alumni Magazine article." Seattle Pacific University.
 Watson, Charles Hoyt. DeShazer, the Amazing Story of Sergeant Jacob DeShazer: The Doolittle Raider Who Turned Missionary. Winona Lake, Indiana: The Light and Life Press, 1950.

Further reading
 Cohen, Stan, Jim Farmer and Joe Boddy. Destination: Tokyo: A Pictorial History of Doolittle's Tokyo Raid, 18 April 1942. Missoula, Montana: Pictorial Histories Publishing Company, 1992. .
 "DeShazer's Biography." freemethodistchurch.org.
 Glines, Carroll V. The Doolittle Raid: America's First Strike Against Japan. Atglen, Pennsylvania: Schiffer Publishing, 2000. .
 Glines, Carroll V. Four Came Home: The Gripping Story of the Survivors of Jimmy Doolittle's Two Lost Crews. Missoula, Montana: Pictorial Histories Publishing Company, 1996. .
 Goldstein, Donald M. and Carol Aiko DeShazer Dixon. Return of the Raider: A Doolittle Raider's Story of War and Forgiveness. 2010. (Carol Aiko DeShazer Dixon is DeShazer's daughter.)
 Hembree, Charles R. From Pearl Harbor to the Pulpit. Akron, Ohio: Rex Humbard World Ministry, 1975.
 Hoppes, Jonna Doolittle. Calculated Risk: The Extraordinary Life of Jimmy Doolittle, Aviation Pioneer and World War II Hero. Santa Monica, California: Santa Monica Press, 2005. . (Written by Doolittle's granddaughter)
 Nelson, Craig. The First Heroes: The Extraordinary Story of the Doolittle Raid, America's First World War II Victory. London: Penguin, 2002. .
 Prange, Gordon W., Donald M. Goldstein and Katherine V. Dillon. God's Samurai: Lead Pilot at Pearl Harbor. Washington, D.C.: Potomac Books Inc, 2003. .  (The best biography of Captain Mitsuo Fuchida's life, includes his life encounters with Jacob DeShazer)
Further viewing
 Browne, Pamela K. "War Stories with Oliver North: Doolittle Raid". Fox News Network, 2002.  (DeShazer is being interviewed throughout the documentary and the DeShazer and Fuchida story is told at the end.)
 "One Hour Over Tokyo: The Doolittle Raid". The History Channel, 2001.  (DeShazer is being interviewed throughout the documentary and the DeShazer and Fuchida story is told at the end.)

External links
 Jacob Daniel DeShazer, 6584514, Staff Sergeant Bombardier Crew 16
 Jacob DeShazer: Member of the Doolittle Raid and a Prisoner of Japan
 Congressional Gold Medal 
 Oregon War Veterans Association
 DeShazer Memorabilia and Anecdotes
 DeShazer's Mother 
 Doolittle Tokyo Raiders
 Jacob DeShazer's personal testimony

1912 births
2008 deaths
People from Salem, Oregon
Military personnel from Oregon
United States Army soldiers
Recipients of the Distinguished Flying Cross (United States)
World War II prisoners of war held by Japan
Free Methodist Church members
Seattle Pacific University alumni
American Methodist missionaries
Methodist missionaries in Japan
People from Madras, Oregon
Doolittle Raiders
Asbury Theological Seminary alumni
American prisoners of war in World War II
American evangelicals